McKinley is an unincorporated community, in Abington Township, Montgomery County, Pennsylvania, United States. McKinley is located along Forrest Avenue between Pennsylvania Route 73 (Township Line Road) and Jenkintown Road southeast of Jenkintown.

References

Unincorporated communities in Montgomery County, Pennsylvania
Unincorporated communities in Pennsylvania